Erythrodecton is a genus of two species of lichen-forming fungi in the family Roccellaceae. The genus was circumscribed in 1991 by Swedish botanist Göran Thor, with E. granulatum assigned as the type species.

References

Roccellaceae
Arthoniomycetes genera
Lichen genera
Taxa described in 1990